Shyamal Mitra (14 January 1929 – 15 November 1987) was an Indian versatile playback singer and music director along with Hemanta Mukherjee and Manna Dey. Mitra had also worked in many Hindi and Bengali films as a music director and film producer.  He was the most notable musician of the golden era of Bengali music industry. His baritone voice reflected a range of emotions. Besides recording a huge number of popular Bengali basic songs, he also worked as a playback singer in more than a hundred Bengali films and directed music in more than fifty Bengali films. He also sang in various other Indian languages, like Hindi, Assamese and Oriya.

Early life
Shyamal Mitra was born in Naihati, a city near Kolkata, India. Their native village was Patul, near Seakhala. His father, Dr. Sadhan Kumar Mitra, was a reputed doctor in Naihati. The father wanted his son to follow in his footsteps and to become a doctor, but the son was very keen on music and was always inspired by his mother and the local singer Mrinal Kanti Ghosh. People associated with the I.P.T.A. movement used to visit Sadhan-babu's house and this gave the chance to young Shyamal Mitra to come in contact with Salil Chowdhury. Young Shyamal Mitra and his youngest sister Reba used to sing "O Aalor Pathajatree" on the road for I.P.T.A.

Shyamal Mitra went to Hooghly Mohsin College, then affiliated with the University of Calcutta, for his graduation degree. There he met Satinath Mukhopadhyay, another prominent exponent of modern music. Satinath inspired him. Then Shyamal Mitra came to Kolkata and met Sudhirlal Chackraborty. That was the turning point of his life. He started struggling until he got a chance to playback in "Sunandar Biye" with Supriti Ghosh and Pratima Bandyopadhyay in 1949, and recorded his first basic songs from H.M.V. under the supervision of Sudhirlal Chackraborty. After the sad demise of Sudhirlal Chackraborty in 1952, he recorded "Smriti Tumi Bedonar". That was the turning point and he never looked back after that. He became one of the leading singers and composers of the country.

Journey as musician
Shyamal Mitra started working as a singer and music composer for the Bengali music industry. During the fifties and early sixties he composed music for hit films like Joy Maa Kali Boarding, Jamalaye Jibonto Manush, and Bhranti Bilash. During this period he also worked as playback singer in many Bengali films.

In 1963, he produced a film called Deya Neya, another milestone of his career. Then he produced more films like Rajkanya, Kheya, and Ami Se O Sakha. He was also the distributor and producer of "Garh Nasimpur".

Shyamal Mitra went to Mumbai in the early fifties with Salil Chowdhury. He worked in three films: Musafer, Biraj Bou, and Naukri. In 1973, he again went to Mumbai. He worked in Shakti Samanta's films, like Amanush, Anand Ashram, F.C.Mehra's film Bandi, Basu Chatterjee's films like Safed Jhoot, and Mamta. He came back to Kolkata again and created many hit tracks in both Bengali basic and film songs.

Shyamal Mitra had a long association with All India Radio. He also sang in the famous Mahisasura Mardini programme of All India Radio. That song was "Subhra sankha robe" with co-artists Arati Mukhopadhyay and Ashima Mukherjee.

Beside modern Bengali songs and film songs, Shyamal Mitra worked with many other different forms of Bengali music like Rabindrasangeet, Nazrul Geeti, "Chotoder Gaan", and Atul Prasadi. As a music composer, he also worked in a Yatra Pala called "Bibi Anondomoyee".

As a music composer, Shyamal Mitra worked with many major artists like Hemanta Kumar Mukhopadhyay, Tarun Bandyopadhyay, Dhananjay Bhattacharya, Pratima Bandyopadhyay, Sandhya Mukhopadhyay, Satinath Mukhopadhyay, Ila Basu, Supriti Ghosh, Gayatri Basu, Utpala Sen, Alpana Banerjee, Manabendra Mukhopadhyay, Talat Mahmood and Kishore Kumar.

As an actor, Shyamal Mitra, worked in Bengali movies like Sharey Chuattar and Saapmochan.

Shyamal Mitra died on 15 November 1987, leaving behind his wife Protima Mitra, son Saibal Mitra and Saikat Mitra, daughter Monobina.  His son Saikat has his singing legacy with him, who has become a star Bengali singer singing Shyamal Mitra's songs.

The Bengali audience will never forget his songs like "Tomar Samadhi Phule Phule Dhaka", "Gaane Bhubon Bhoriye Debe", "Amar Sopne Dekha Rajkonyya", "Ami Tomar Kachei Phire Ashbo", "Ke Jane Kobe Abar", "O Mon Kokhon Suru", "Tinti Montro Niye Jader Jibon", "O Shimul Bon", "Emono Din Ashte Pare", "Sediner Sona Jhora Sondha", "Naam Rakhechi Bonolata", "Ei Sundor Prithibi Chere", 'Jhiri jhiri baataas kaande' and many others.

As music composer

As playback singer

See also
 List of Indian film music directors

References

External links
 
 Shyamal Mitra

Bengali people
Bengali singers
Bengali musicians
1929 births
1987 deaths
Hooghly Mohsin College alumni
Indian film score composers
Bengali playback singers
Indian male playback singers
People from North 24 Parganas district
20th-century Indian composers
20th-century Indian singers
Singers from West Bengal
Indian male film score composers
20th-century Indian male singers
Singers from Kolkata